Alie Badara Mansaray has been Commissioner of the Sierra Leone National Commission for Social Action (NaCSA) since December 2014.

He graduated from Njala University with a bachelor's degree in Agricultural Education in 1983 and an MA in Development Studies from the University of East Anglia in 2005.

References

Year of birth missing (living people)
Living people
Njala University alumni
Alumni of the University of East Anglia
Place of birth missing (living people)
Sierra Leonean politicians